Dominic Smith is an Australian-American novelist.

Early life and education
Smith was born in Brisbane, Australia in 1971. He grew up in the Blue Mountains and in Sydney. His father was an American corporate manager, his Australian mother worked as a secretary. Smith, one of four children, was eight years old when his parents separated. The following year, the family home burned down and Smith's mother suffered a stroke and became disabled; the family struggled to make ends meet.   Australian politician Tamara Smith is his sister.

Smith graduated from college in 1994 at age 23 with a B.A. in anthropology. He completed an MFA in creative writing on a Michener Fellowship at the University of Texas at Austin in 2003.

He lives in Seattle, Washington with his wife, an instructional coach and early-childhood specialist. He has two daughters. Smith teaches in the Warren Wilson MFA Program for Writers.

Publications
Smith's writing has appeared in The New York Times, The Atlantic, Texas Monthly and The Australian. His novel The Last Painting of Sara de Vos was a New York Times bestseller.

Novels
 The Electric Hotel: A Novel (Farrar, Straus, Giroux/Sarah Crichton Books, June 2019)
 The Last Painting of Sara de Vos (2016, Farrar, Straus, Giroux/Sarah Crichton Books in USA; Allen & Unwin in Australia) Bright and Distant Shores (Atria, 2011)The Beautiful Miscellaneous (Atria, 2007)The Mercury Visions of Louis Daguerre'' (Atria, 2006)

Awards and Fellowships
 National Endowment for the Arts Literature Fellowship 2018 
 Australia Council for the Arts New Works Grant 
 Dobie Paisano Fellowship

References

21st-century American novelists
1971 births
Michener Center for Writers alumni
Living people